Dyringshøi is a mountain in Skjåk Municipality in Innlandet county, Norway. The mountain is surrounded by several other notable mountains including Skridulaupen to the north, Sandåtinden and Mårådalsfjellet to the northwest, Leirvasshøi to the west, Tverreggi to the southwest, and Søverhøi to the south. The lake Rauddalsvatnet lies just north of the mountain.

See also
List of mountains of Norway

References

Skjåk
Mountains of Innlandet